Abishai may refer to:
Abishai (biblical figure), the eldest son of Zeruiah, King David's sister
Abishai, a Semitic chief who offered gifts to the Lord of Beni-Hasan according to an inscription in Middle Egypt.
Abishai (Dungeons & Dragons), a type of monster in Dungeons & Dragons
Avishai (given name)